Mason may refer to the following places in the U.S. state of Kentucky:
Mason, Grant County, Kentucky
Mason, Magoffin County, Kentucky